Jason Banks (born 1996) is a Scottish international lawn and indoor bowler.

Bowls career
Banks reached the 2014 National Indoor Singles final and in 2019 won the National Under 25 Singles. In 2019 he won the Junior singles title at the IIBC Championships. In 2017, he won three medals at the European Bowls Championships.

In 2020, he was selected for the 2020 World Outdoor Bowls Championship in Australia as the men's team travelling reserve.

Banks recorded his best result to date when reaching the final of the 2023 World Indoor Bowls Championship, he was unlucky to lose to Jamie Walker after playing so consistently in the final.

Family
His father Colin Banks and his sister Carla Banks are both international bowlers.

References

Scottish male bowls players
1996 births
Living people